The 2021 Paris–Nice was a road cycling stage race held between 7 and 14 March 2021 in France. It was the 79th edition of Paris–Nice and the fourth race of the 2021 UCI World Tour.

Teams
Twenty-three teams participated in the race, including all nineteen UCI WorldTeams and four UCI ProTeams. Each team entered seven riders, for a total of 161 riders, of which 127 finished the race.

UCI WorldTeams

 
 
 
 
 
 
 
 
 
 
 
 
 
 
 
 
 
 
 

UCI ProTeams

Route

Stages

Stage 1
7 March 2021 — Saint-Cyr-l'École to Saint-Cyr-l'École,

Stage 2
8 March 2021 — Oinville-sur-Montcient to Amilly,

Stage 3
9 March 2021 — Gien to Gien,  (ITT)

Stage 4
10 March 2021 — Chalon-sur-Saône to Chiroubles,

Stage 5
11 March 2021 — Vienne to Bollène,

Stage 6
12 March 2021 — Brignoles to Biot,

Stage 7
13 March 2021 — Nice Le Broc to Valdeblore La Colmiane,

Stage 8
14 March 2021 — Nice Le Plan du Var to Nice Levens,

Classification leadership table

 On stage 2, Mads Pedersen, who was third in the points classification, wore the green jersey, because first-placed Sam Bennett wore the yellow jersey as the leader of the general classification and second-placed Arnaud Démare wore the jersey of the French national road race champion.
 On stage 4, Brandon McNulty, who was second in the young rider classification, wore the white jersey, because first-placed Stefan Bissegger wore the yellow jersey as the leader of the general classification.
 On stages 5, 7, and 8, Sam Bennett, who was second in the points classification, wore the green jersey, because first-placed Primož Roglič wore the yellow jersey as the leader of the general classification.

Final classification standings

General classification

Points classification

Mountains classification

Young rider classification

Team classification

References

Notes

External links

2021
2021 UCI World Tour
2021 in French sport
March 2021 sports events in France